Maarten Bouwknecht (born 14 December 1994) is a professional basketball player who plays for ZZ Leiden. Born in Groningen, he started his career with Donar in 2013. Standing at 1.85 m (6 ft 1 in), he usually plays as point guard or shooting guard.

Career
After playing in the youth teams of the club, Bouwknecht signed with the first team of GasTerra Flames (the sponsored name of Donar) in the summer of 2013. He won the Dutch Basketball League (DBL) championship and the NBB Cup in 2014.

On 23 June 2015, he signed a three-year contract with Den Bosch. In the 2015–16 season, Bouwknecht was named the DBL MVP Under 23.

On 20 August 2019, Bouwknecht signed with the Worcester Wolves of the British Basketball League (BBL). With the Wolves, Bouwknecht won the BBL Cup title.

On 4 July 2021, Bouwknecht returned to the Netherlands when he signed a one-year contract with ZZ Leiden. He won the first-ever BNXT League championship with the team. On 14 June 2022, he extended his contract with two more seasons, until 2024.

On 12 March 2023, he won the Dutch Basketball Cup with Leiden after defeating Landstede Hammers in the final. Bouwknecht scored a game-high 19 points in the final.

National team career 
Bouwknecht made his debut for the Netherlands men's national basketball team on 7 July 2017, under coach Toon van Helfteren in a game against Bulgaria.

References

External links
DBL Profile

1994 births
Living people
Dutch men's basketball players
Dutch Basketball League players
Donar (basketball club) players
Heroes Den Bosch players
Worcester Wolves players
Point guards
Shooting guards
Sportspeople from Groningen (city)
ZZ Leiden players